Valingu is a village in Saue Parish, Harju County in northern Estonia. It is located by the Tallinn–Keila railway between Saue (5 km northeast) and Keila (3 km west). Valingu has a station on the Elron western route. As of 2011 Census, the village's population was 299.

Valingu Manor (Walling) was established in the 1640s. The classicist one-storey stone main building from the beginning of the 19th century hasn't survived.

References

Villages in Harju County